is a Japanese physicist and professor at Tohoku University known for his contributions to the field of phase-contrast X-ray imaging.

Biography
Born in 1962 in Toyama Prefecture, Momose graduated with a Master's degree in Engineering from The University of Tokyo in 1987. Between 1987 and 1999, he worked at the Hitachi's Advanced Research Laboratory. During this time he completed his doctoral degree. 1997-1998 he worked one year at the synchrotron facility ESRF in Grenoble, France. In 1999, he was appointed associate professor at the department of applied physics at The University of Tokyo. In 2003, he was appointed associate professor at the Graduate School of Frontier Science. In 2012, he was appointed full professor at Tohoku University in Sendai.

Research
Momose is mainly known for his work on grating-based phase-contrast X-ray imaging. He was the first to show that this could be accomplish in a Talbot setup with two gratings and a detector. He was also one of the first to show grating-based imaging in combination with tomography.

Awards
2021 22nd Optical and Quantum Electronics Achievement Award (Hiroshi Takuma Award) from the Japan Society of Applied Physics

References 

Living people
1962 births
Japanese physicists
University of Tokyo alumni
Academic staff of the University of Tokyo
Academic staff of Tohoku University
People from Toyama Prefecture